Yeading Brook Meadows is a 17 hectare Local Nature Reserve (LNR) in Yeading in the London Borough of Hillingdon. It is owned by Hillingdon Council and managed by the London Wildlife Trust (LWT). In the north it adjoins Ten Acre Wood across the Golden Bridge (over Yeading Brook) and Charville Lane; it then stretches south along the banks of the Yeading Brook to Yeading Lane. The reserve is also part of the Yeading Brook Meadows Site of Metropolitan Importance for Nature Conservation, which includes two neighbouring LNRs managed by the London Wildlife Trust, Ten Acre Wood and Gutteridge Wood and Meadows.

The site is mainly grassland, with a variety of wild flowers such as the narrow-leaved water-dropwort and common spotted orchid. Invertebrates include Roesel's bush-crickets, shield bugs and skipper butterflies, and there are birds such as skylark and snipe.

There is access from a number of points including Charville Lane, Kingshill Avenue and Greenway.

Notes

References

Nature reserves in the London Borough of Hillingdon
Local nature reserves in Greater London
London Wildlife Trust
Meadows in Greater London